Astra Heights is an alternative rock band originally from Houston, Texas. They now live and work in Los Angeles.  In 2007 they released a full-length album, Good Problems, on iTunes through Universal Records.

History
Morales brothers Mark, James, Joshua, and Phillip formed Astra Heights in the basement of their parents' house in Houston in 2001. In 2003 Mark, James, and Joshua moved to Los Angeles, while Phillip remained in Texas to pursue a different career path. He was replaced by Bernard Yin, a veteran guitarist who has played with SoCal indie darlings El Vez, Medicine, Pansy Division and The Fuzztones (under a stage name) and others. A record deal shortly followed. Astra Heights recorded their debut album Good Problems for Universal Records with producer David Kahne in 2007.  They later self released an acoustic EP The Engineer's Library in 2008. In 2009, the group worked with acclaimed producer Jack Douglas on new songs and in 2010, Astra Heights independently released Ship of Theseus, produced by Brian Irwin and the band while mixed by Daniel Mendez. Bernard Yin has since performed and/or recorded with Globus, Chum, The Insect Surfers as well as created music for film and television.

Discography
 Good Problems (2007)
 The Engineer's Library (2008)
 Ship of Theseus (2010)

See also
Globus

References

External links
Astra Heights
Astra Heights at Imperativa

Musical groups from Houston
Alternative rock groups from Texas
Musical groups established in 2001
Globus (music)